A statistical business register (SBR) plays a central part in a system of official economic statistics at a national statistics office.

A company register has a different purpose: protection, accountability and control of legal entities.

Register contents

Data sources 

Countries use whatever data sources they seem relevant. E.g. they often integrate a company register in one form or another.

Type of business units 
In EU a corresponding regulation define register contents:

 all enterprises carrying on economic activities contributing to the gross domestic product (GDP), and their local units
 the legal units of which those enterprises consist
 enterprise groups

Characteristics 

 identification properties
 identification number
 name
 address
 contact info
 VAT number
 dates of creation/liquidation
 main activity
 operational status
 legal form
 links to other registries
 links to other organizations or structural units
 control
 ownership
 employees

Business registries in the world 

United Nations Economic Commission for Europe provides Guidelines on Statistical Business Registers which describes the roles of the statistical business register.

European Commission provides a legal framework for business registers for statistical purposes.

See: List of company, tax and statistical business registers

References 

Economic databases
Corporate law